Millar Adam Hay (born 20 May 1946) is a Scottish retired amateur footballer who made over 150 appearances in the Scottish League for Queen's Park as a forward. He also played for Clyde and Hamilton Academical. Hay represented Scotland at amateur level and made two 1968 Summer Olympic qualifying appearances for Great Britain.

References

Scottish footballers
Scottish Football League players
Queen's Park F.C. players
Association football forwards
Living people
1946 births
Clyde F.C. players
Hamilton Academical F.C. players
Footballers from Glasgow
Scotland amateur international footballers